Chakradhari may refer to:

 Chakradhari (1948 film), a 1948 Tamil film
 Chakradhari (1954 film), a 1954 Hindi film
 Chakradhari (1977 film), a 1977 Telugu film